Cristóbal Robuster y Senmanat or Cristóbal Robuster y Senmanat (1524–1597) was a Roman Catholic prelate who served as Bishop of Orihuela (1587–1593).

Biography
Cristóbal Robuster y Senmanat was born in Reus, Catalonia, Spain in 1524.
On 17 Aug 1587, he was appointed during the papacy of Pope Sixtus V as Bishop of Orihuela.
On 25 Nov 1587, he was consecrated bishop by Giovanni Battista Castagna, Cardinal-Priest of San Marcello, with Scipione Gonzaga, Titular Patriarch of Jerusalem, and Vincenzo Casali, Bishop Emeritus of Massa Marittima, serving as co-consecrators. 
He served as Bishop of Orihuela until his resignation on 9 Nov 1593. 
He died on 19 Oct 1597 in Rome, Italy.

Episcopal succession
While bishop, he was the principal co-consecrator of:

References

External links and additional sources
 (for Chronology of Bishops)
 (for Chronology of Bishops)

16th-century Roman Catholic bishops in Spain
Bishops appointed by Pope Sixtus V
1524 births
1597 deaths